Shovayye Atij (also Romanized as Shovayye‘ ‘Atīj) is a village in Hoseynabad Rural District, in the Central District of Shush County, Khuzestan Province, Iran. At the 2006 census, its population was 75, in 11 families.

References 

Populated places in Shush County